Suna Yıldızoğlu (born Sonja Eady on 26 February 1955) is an English-Turkish actress and singer, based in Turkey.

Her parents divorced when she was 18. She has six brothers. Since primary school, she showed interest in theatre and dancing and at the age of 11 began acting on stage. An English national, Yıldızoğlu moved to Turkey in 1974. Upon marrying actor Kayhan Yıldızoğlu, she changed her surname and acquired Turkish citizenship. She graduated from French, Spanish, German Languages of Literature. She made her debut in Cinema of Turkey in 1977 with a leading role in Yıkılmayan Adam alongside Cüneyt Arkın. In 1981, she was a contestant at the 17th Golden Orpheus Acting Contest and won the Özel Burgaz Award and Journalists Award. She further rose to prominence by acting alongside Zeki Alasya and Metin Akpınar in Petrol Kralları, and with Kemal Sunal in Gol Kralı.

From her marriage to Dudley Allen, she has two children: Yasemin Kay Allen and Dyon Kaan Allen. In 2000, she went on a hiatus when she moved to Australia for her children to study abroad.

Filmography 

 Çukur - 2020
 Söz - 2018
 46 Yok Olan - 2016
 Yerden Yüksek
 Elif - 2008
 Eşref Saati - 2007 
 Eskici Baba - 2000 
 Küçük Besleme - 1999 
 Yalan - 1997 
 Sara ile Musa - 1996 
 Sevda Kondu - 1996 
 Sokaktaki Adam - 1995 
 Sevgili Ortak - 1993 
 Bizim Takım - 1993 
 Kopuk Dünyalar - 1992 
 Yaralı Can - 1987 
 Biraz Neşe Biraz Keder - 1986 
 Tarzan Rıfkı - 1986 
 Nokta İle Virgül Deh Deh Düldül - 1985 
 Şaşkın Gelin - 1984 
 Ömrümün Tek Gecesi - 1984 
 Kürtaj - 1981 
 Uyanık Aptallar - 1981 
 Kurban Olduğum - 1980
 Kul Sevdası - 1980 
 Akıllı Deliler - 1980 
 Gol Kralı - 1980 
 Nokta İle Virgül Paldır Küldür - 1979 
 Aşk Ve Adalet - 1978 
 Seven Unutmaz - 1978 
 Petrol Kralları - 1978 
 Güneşli Bataklık - 1977 
 Bir Adam Yaratmak - 1977 
 Garip - 1977 
 Şıpsevdi - 1977 
 Bir Yürek Satıldı - 1977 
 Kan - 1977 
 Yıkılmayan Adam - 1977

Discography 
 Do You Think I'm Sexy / I'm Gonna Dance (1981)
 Son Olsun / Sonsuz Aşk (with Çetin Alp) (1981)
 Türküler Türkülerimiz / Avrasya (1991)
 46 Yok Olan (2016)

Awards 
 1981: Golden Orpheus Contest - Jury Special Award
 1996: 18th SİYAD Turkish Cinema Awards - Best Actress (Sokaktaki Adam)

References

External links 
 

Turkish film actresses
Turkish television actresses
Turkish singers
English-language singers from Turkey
Turkish people of English descent
Living people
1955 births